Tabory is a rural locality (a selo) in Dobryansky District, Perm Krai, Russia. The population was 37 as of 2010.

Geography 
Tabory is located 58 km northeast of Dobryanka (the district's administrative centre) by road. Tabory (settlement) is the nearest rural locality.

References 

Rural localities in Dobryansky District